Al Wafeer Air (Arabic:Al-Wafeer Al Thoyaran) was a charter airline based in Jeddah, Saudi Arabia. Its main operations were Hajj and Umrah charters. It was founded by Adnan Dabbagh, former Executive Vice-President of Operations of Saudia. The major stakeholders in the carrier were Saudia which held a (40%) stake in the carrier, with Bin Laden Group, the Naghi Group and Al Tayyar Travel Group holding (12.75%).

Al Wafeer ended operations in 2011.

They had operated one Airbus A310-300 leased from White Airways and three Boeing 747-400 leased from Malaysia Airlines.

Controversy

In February 2011, a Malaysian daily reported that cabin crews working with Al Wafeer were only paid half of their salaries and also their allowances' payment had been put on hold. However, the issue was solved when Al Wafeer agreed to pay the outstanding dues.

The company to date still owes hundreds of thousands of US Dollars to employees after giving them written guarantees that the dues will be settled in early 2011.
Many foreign pilots departed without fully understanding the rules of the labour courts in KSA and as KSA does not permit any visitors to enter the country, the pilots were not able to pursue their claims in the labour court.
Salah Bin Laden refuses to pay, pleading poverty and lack of cash.
Adnan Dabbagh remains in his home, as there are arrest warrants for his dealings in the company, and connections with highly influential people protects him.
The company was total mismanaged, the CEO was clueless, the DFO did not have any idea about how to manage flight operations department. The vast majority of the local employees came from loss making Saudi Arabian Airline, and Cleary did not understand the concept of productivity, efficiency and profit.

References

External links
Al Wafeer Air

Saudi Arabian companies established in 2011
2011 disestablishments in Saudi Arabia
Airlines established in 2009
Airlines disestablished in 2011
Defunct airlines of Saudi Arabia
Defunct charter airlines